Yenice is a village in the Enez District of Edirne Province in Turkey.

References

Villages in Enez District
Articles with Turkish-language sources (tr)